Bedding is material used above a mattress.

Bedding may also refer to: 
 Bedding (animals)
 Bedding ceremony
 Bedding (geology)
 Bedding (horticulture)
 Rifle bedding

See also
 Bed (disambiguation)